Ysco is a Belgian producer of ice cream. Since its foundation in 1949, the company has become a prominent European leader in the production of frozen desserts.  Ysco is part of the  dairy cooperative Milcobel. Ysco is a private label specialist supplying the largest European retailers but is also an important market player in the Foodservice sector with a range of own brands.
Among the most notable own ice cream brands are Ysco and Appassionato.

History

See also
 List of ice cream brands

References

External links
Ysco official website

Agricultural cooperatives
Food and drink companies of Belgium
Ice cream brands
Cooperatives in Belgium
Companies based in West Flanders